Alisa Kresge (born April 1, 1985) is a former American women's basketball player and current coach. She is the head coach of the Vermont Catamounts women's basketball team.

Playing career
Kresge played at Marist where she was part of four MAAC regular season title teams, and three MAAC tournament championship teams. With the Red Foxes, Kresge made three NCAA Tournament appearances as a player, culminating in a Sweet 16 appearance in 2007. She graduated as the school's all-time leader in assists with 596, and second all-time in steals with 222.

Marist statistics

Source

Coaching career

Marist
In 2009, Kresge joined the coaching staff of her alma mater under Brian Giorgis. The Red Foxes would reach the postseason six of the eight years she was on staff with five NCAA Tournament appearances and a WNIT appearance.

Vermont
Kresge joined the coaching staff at Vermont in 2016, serving as associate head coach under Chris Day. After Day resigned his position amid an investigation into his verbal conduct and subsequently took an assistant coaching position at La Salle, Kresge was given the title of interim head coach for the 2018–19 season.

During her interim coaching season, Kresge guided the Catamounts to its best record in nearly a decade going 11–18 overall for the most wins since the 2009–10 season. On April 9, 2019 the interim tag was officially lifted and Kresge was named the ninth head coach in Vermont women's basketball history. During the 2021-22 season, Kresge led the Catamounts to the first 20-win season since the 2009-10 season, finishing with a 20-11 overall record and an appearance in the semifinals of the 2022 America East tournament.

Head coaching record

Vermont discontinued its season due to COVID-19 on January 24, 2021.

References

External links
 Official biography, Vermont Catamounts

1985 births
Living people
American women's basketball coaches
Basketball coaches from New Jersey
Basketball players from New Jersey
Marist Red Foxes women's basketball players
Marist Red Foxes women's basketball coaches
Vermont Catamounts women's basketball coaches
People from Holmdel Township, New Jersey
Sportspeople from Monmouth County, New Jersey
21st-century American women